Runfold is a suburb of Luton in the north of the town, centred on Birdsfoot Lane, in the Luton district, in the ceremonial county of Bedfordshire, England. It is roughly bounded by Grasmere Road to the north, the River Lea, Grosvenor Road, Runfold Avenue and Catsbrook Road to the south, Icknield Way to the west, and the A6, Enderby Road, and Birdsfoot Lane to the east.

Local area
At the centre of Runfold on Birdsfoot Lane there is a parade of shops at the junction with Laburnum Grove. Included are a newsagent, co-op, hairdresser, pharmacist, hospice shop, dentist, bakery, off-licence, and a laundrette. There is also a small shopping area in the south of the area, also on Birdsfoot Lane, near the junction with Dewsbury Road. There is a local pub on Icknield Way called The Jolly Milliner (originally The Boater). Icknield Primary School and Icknield High School are also in the area.

Politics 

Runfold is part of the Limbury and Icknield wards.

The wards form part of the parliamentary constituency of Luton North and the MP is Sarah Owen (Labour).

References 

Areas of Luton